The fifth and final season of the American drama/adventure television series Alias premiered September 29, 2005, on ABC and concluded May 22, 2006, and was released on DVD in region 1 on November 21, 2006. Guest stars in season five include Gina Torres and  Lena Olin.

Season 5 returned to Alias's former viewing schedule by starting on September 29, 2005 (U.S.) and concluded on May 22, 2006. The previous season aired entirely in 2005, beginning in January and concluding in May. Between December 2005 and April 2006, the series went on hiatus due to Jennifer Garner's real-life pregnancy, which was written into the season's storyline, as well as news of the show's cancellation. Season 5 consisted of 17 episodes, including four double-length episodes; two aired back-to-back upon its return from hiatus, and another two aired back-to-back for the series finale.

Cast
Main characters
 Jennifer Garner as Sydney Bristow (17 episodes)
 Ron Rifkin as Arvin Sloane (17 episodes)
 Carl Lumbly as Marcus Dixon (17 episodes)
 Kevin Weisman as Marshall Flinkman (17 episodes)
 Rachel Nichols as Rachel Gibson (17 episodes)
 Élodie Bouchez as Renée Rienne (9 episodes)
 Balthazar Getty as Thomas Grace (15 episodes)
 Amy Acker as Kelly Peyton (13 episodes)
 Victor Garber as Jack Bristow (17 episodes)

Recurring characters

Episodes

Home release
The Season 5 Set was released in Region 1 (4-Disc Set, NTSC, U.S.) on November 21, 2006.  In Region 2 (5-Disc Set, PAL, UK) on November 20, 2006, and Region 4 (5-Disc Set, PAL, AU) on October 14, 2007.

Region 4 was initially supposed to receive Season 5 (5-Disc Set, PAL, Australia) on March 14, 2007, however Buena Vista postponed the title due to the Seven Network's delayed broadcast of the series.

The DVD set includes the final 17 episodes of the series, presented in Anamorphic Widescreen (1.78:1), along with English Dolby Digital 5.1 audio.  The set contains the following extras.

 Celebrating 100: Behind The Scenes Of The 100th Episode
 The Legend of Rambaldi
 Heightening the Drama: The Music of Alias
 The New Recruit: On Set with Rachel Nichols
 Season 5 Bloopers
 Deleted Scenes
 Audio Commentaries by Jennifer Garner, J. J. Abrams, Victor Garber, Rachel Nichols, David Anders, and others.
 Hidden Easter Eggs

References

External links
 Season 5 on www.alias-tv.com
 

2005 American television seasons
2006 American television seasons
Alias (TV series) seasons